J52 may refer to:
 Augmented pentagonal prism
 , a Hunt-class minesweeper of the Royal Navy
 , a Bangor-class minesweeper of the Royal Navy and Royal Canadian Navy
 LNER Class J52, a British steam locomotive class
 Malaysia Federal Route J52
 Pratt & Whitney J52, a turbojet engine